The College of Osteopathic Medicine of the Pacific, Northwest, also known as COMP Northwest, is a non-profit, private medical school for osteopathic medicine located in Lebanon, in the U.S. state of Oregon. Opened in 2011, the school is a branch campus of Western University of Health Sciences' College of Osteopathic Medicine of the Pacific, and is operated in partnership with Samaritan Health Services. Graduates of the college receive the Doctor of Osteopathic Medicine degree. The university eventually plans to open additional colleges at the Lebanon campus.

History

Plans for the school were announced as early as 2007,  and in January 2008 it was announced the school would partner with Willamette Valley based Samaritan Health Services. A year later, the planned school received accreditation by the American Osteopathic Association, and in June 2009 groundbreaking took place for the first building on the campus, a  structure owned by Samaritan Health Services and leased to the school. That building was estimated to cost $15 million to build, and COMP Northwest signed a 20-year lease on the building.

During the 76th Oregon Legislative Assembly, the Senate passed a resolution to "congratulate the College of Osteopathic Medicine of the Pacific Northwest, thank the founders for their commitment to the people of Oregon and wish the college success in the future". The school opened in August 2011 with an initial enrollment of 107 students, and 15 full-time faculty members. At that time tuition was $47,000 and the college planned to eventually grow to 400 students. COMP Northwest is expected to nearly double the number of Oregon residents graduating as physicians from medical school. In March 2012, the Lebanon Area Chamber of Commerce gave COMP-Northwest the Small Business of the Year Award. The school's first class of 100 graduated in June 2015.

Academics
The students entering as the inaugural Class of 2015 had an average Medical College Admission Test (MCAT) score of 28 and an average overall GPA of 3.53.

Campus
The campus is located across the street from Samaritan Health Services' Lebanon Community Hospital. The College of Osteopathic Medicine of the Pacific previously provided students for residencies at the hospital before the new branch campus opened. COMP Northwest's campus shares lectures from the home campus in Pomona, California. Lectures are streamed in both directions, with most of the lectures coming from the Pomona campus. The campus has a single two-story building leased from Samaritan Health Services, with an option to buy the building and construct additional buildings at the location.

See also
 List of medical schools in the United States
 Western University College of Podiatric Medicine
 Western University College of Veterinary Medicine

References

External links

COMP Northwest brochure

Osteopathic medical schools in the United States
Educational institutions established in 2011
Private universities and colleges in Oregon
Education in Linn County, Oregon
Medical schools in Oregon
Lebanon, Oregon
2011 establishments in Oregon
Western University of Health Sciences